Oh What a World may refer to:

 Oh What a World (album), a 2000 album by Paul Brady
 "Oh What a World" (song), a 2004 song by Rufus Wainwright
 "Oh, What a World", a 2018 song by Kacey Musgraves from Golden Hour